English Corner is a designated place within the Halifax Regional Municipality in Nova Scotia, Canada.

Demographics 

References

Communities in Halifax County, Nova Scotia
Designated places in Nova Scotia